Koilwar Bridge, (officially Abdul Bari Bridge) at Koilwar in Bhojpur spans the  Sone river. This 1.44 km long, 2-lane wide rail-cum-road bridge connects Arrah with Patna, the capital of Bihar state in India. The bridge is named after Indian academic and social reformer Prof. Abdul Bari, and is presently the oldest operational railway bridge in India standing since 04 November 1862. It is shown in the 1982 Oscar award winning film Gandhi, directed by Richard Attenborough. From 1862 to 1900, Koilwar bridge remained as the longest river bridge in India.

The steel lattice girder Koilwar Bridge (known as Sone Bridge when it was built) was the longest bridge in the subcontinent when built: construction started in 1856, disrupted by the Revolt of 1857, and completed in 1862. A 2-lane wide road (Old NH 30) runs under the twin rail tracks. It connects Arrah on the west side to Bihta, Danapur and Patna on the east side of Sone river.

The Koilwar bridge was inaugurated by the then  Viceroy and Governor-General of India Lord Elgin, who said,  "... this magnificent bridge is exceeded in magnitude by only one bridge in the world". The bridge was designed by James Meadows Rendel and Sir Matthew Digby Wyatt. It remained as the longest river bridge in the Indian subcontinent, till it was overtaken by the 3.05 Km long Upper Sone Bridge (Nehru Setu) on 27 February 1900.

History
An initial survey of the bridge site was made on 17 February 1851 by George Turnbull, Chief Engineer of the East Indian Railway Company: he determined that the river then was  feet across — the completed bridge was  feet across. He settled on the site near Pures "where the banks are well defined, and the channel had evidently for ages been confined within certain limits, proved by the existence of old Hindoo temples, far before the Mohammaden works at Muneer, built about 200 years [before 1851]."

By November 1859, both abutments and 16 of the 26 piers were being built and the well-sinking for the remaining piers progressing. By 21 December 1860, three of the iron spans were in place; 4572 tons of the estimated 5683 final tons of iron-work for the bridge had arrived from England.

George Turnbull inspected the bridge and judged it complete on 4 November 1862. On 11, 12 and 13 December 1862,  "a set of experiments with couple engines, testing the Keeul, Hullohur and Soane bridges, with an assembly of Government engineers, and our railing engineers; all very satisfactory."  On 5 February 1863, a special train from Howrah took Turnbull, the Viceroy Lord Elgin, Lt Governor Sir Cecil Beadon and others over two days to Benares: they alighted at the bridge and inspected it. In Benares there was a durbar on 7 February to celebrate the building of the railway and particularly the bridging of the Sone, the largest tributary of the Ganges.

Sand erosion near the pillars of this old bridge has created structural problems recently.

New Koilwar Bridge
A new 1.52 km long, 6-lane wide road bridge, parallel to the existing 2-lane wide Koilwar Bridge, has been inaugurated by Union Minister Nitin Gadkari on 10 December 2020. New Koilwar Bridge or Vashishtha Narayan Setu is named after Indian mathematician and Padma Shri awardee Vashishtha Narayan Singh.

See also
 
 Digha–Sonpur Bridge
 Arrah-Chhapra Bridge
 New Koilwar Bridge
 List of road–rail bridges
 List of longest bridges above water in India

References

External links

Bridges in Bihar
Railway bridges in India
Road-rail bridges in India
Bridges completed in 1862
Rohtas district
Road bridges in India
1862 establishments in India
Bridges over the Son River
Patna district
Bhojpur district, India